Liuying is a railway station on the Taiwan Railways Administration West Coast line located in Liouying District, Tainan, Taiwan.

History
The station was opened on 1 June 1960.

Nearby stations
Taiwan Railways Administration
  ⇐ West Coast line ⇒

Around the station
 Liu Chi-hsiang Art Gallery and Memorial Hall
 Liu Clan Shrine

See also
 List of railway stations in Taiwan

1960 establishments in Taiwan
Railway stations in Kaohsiung
Railway stations opened in 1960
Railway stations served by Taiwan Railways Administration